Timbuctoo is a 1933 British comedy film, co-directed by Walter Summers and Arthur B. Woods for British International Pictures, and starring Henry Kendall and Margot Grahame.  Although BIP had a reputation for churning out films quickly and cheaply, in this case they allocated enough of a budget to finance location filming in Africa.

Plot
The film's slight storyline concerns a man (Kendall) who has a violent quarrel with his family over his fiancée (Grahame).  Feeling totally upset, he wants to get away from all the conflict and decides to travel overland to Timbuktu with its legendary reputation as one of the most remote and mysterious places in the world.  As soon as his fiancée learns of his departure, she vows to do the same thing and challenges herself to arrive in Timbuktu before him.  Much of the film is essentially taken up with travelogue sequences of African natives and habitats.

Cast
 Henry Kendall as Benedict
 Margot Grahame as Elizabeth
 Emily Fitzroy as Aunt Augusta
 Hubert Harben as Uncle George
 Jean Cadell as Wilhelmina
 Victor Stanley as Henry
 Una O'Connor as Myrtle
 Edward Cooper as Steven

Availability
Timbuctoo does not appear ever to have been shown on television in the UK, nor has it been made available commercially; however, unlike many quota quickie productions of the 1930s, the film has survived and is available to view by appointment at any of the Mediatheques run by the British Film Institute.  Although the film is billed as a comedy, it contains a sequence of a hippopotamus being hunted and killed which some modern viewers have found extremely unpleasant and distressing.

References

External links 
 
 Timbuctoo at BFI Film & TV Database

1933 films
1933 comedy films
British comedy films
Films shot at British International Pictures Studios
British black-and-white films
Films directed by Walter Summers
Films directed by Arthur B. Woods
Timbuktu in popular culture
Films set in Mali
1930s English-language films
1930s British films